"Praise the Lord and Pass the Soup" is a song written by Albert Hammond and Michael Hazlewood and originally recorded by Johnny Cash with The Carter Family and The Oak Ridge Boys.

Released in 1973 as a single (Columbia 4-45890, with "The Ballad of Barbara" on the opposite side), the song reached number 57 on U.S. Billboard country chart for the week of November 4.

Track listing

Charts

References

External links 
 "Praise the Lord and Pass the Soup" on the Johnny Cash official website

Johnny Cash songs
Carter Family songs
The Oak Ridge Boys songs
Songs written by Albert Hammond
Songs written by Mike Hazlewood
Song recordings produced by Albert Hammond
1973 songs
1973 singles
Columbia Records singles